North Sangamon United Presbyterian Church (also known as Indian Point United Presbyterian Church) is a historic Presbyterian church building in Athens, Illinois. The building was constructed between 1860 and 1862 in a Georgian style. While the Georgian style had largely fallen out of favor by 1860, the church is nonetheless considered a good example of the style and features elements such as a steeply pitched pediment with a half-circle vent and fan-shaped decorations. The church housed a Presbyterian congregation which formed in 1832 and ultimately spawned three other congregations in Menard County. In addition, the church also sponsored a local school.

The church was added to the National Register of Historic Places in 1979.

References

Presbyterian churches in Illinois
Churches on the National Register of Historic Places in Illinois
Georgian architecture in Illinois
Churches completed in 1862
Buildings and structures in Menard County, Illinois
1862 establishments in Illinois
National Register of Historic Places in Menard County, Illinois